Vane may refer to:

People
 Vane (surname)
 Vane Featherston (1864–1948), English stage actress
 Ivan Vane Ivanović (1913–1999), Yugoslav-British athlete, shipowner, political activist, and philanthropist
 Vane Pennell (1876–1938), English rackets and real tennis player
 Viscount Vane, an extinct title in the Peerage of Ireland

Places
 Vanë, a settlement in Albania
 Vane, Avatime, a populated place in Ghana
 Vāne Parish, Latvia
 Vane Glacier, Marie Byrd Land, Antarctica

Other uses
 Vane (album), the only album by Bleak, released in 1995
 Parts besides the shaft in a pennaceous feather
 A plastic fin on an arrow
 D-alanine—D-serine ligase, an enzyme (VanE)
 Vane, singular form of Vanir, a group of gods in Norse mythology
 Vane (video game), a video game released for the Playstation 4

See also

 Vane display, a type of 7-segment display
 Vane anemometer
 Cooper vane
 Rotary vane pump
 Weather vane
 Vanes Martirosyan (born 1986) Armenian pro-wrestler
 Vanne (river), France
 
 Vain (disambiguation)